Velutin is a chemical compound isolated from Xylosma velutina and açaí fruit.  It is classified as a flavone.

References

External links
 

Flavones